Bryan Murphy (born September 1967) is an Irish Gaelic football manager and former dual player of hurling and Gaelic football who played for club sides Bishopstown and Clane. He was a member of the Kildare senior football team for six years, while he also lined out with the Cork senior hurling team and the Cork senior football team.

Honours
University College Cork
Fitzgibbon Cup (2): 1990, 1991

Clane
Kildare Senior Football Championship (1): 1997

Cork
Munster Senior Hurling Championship (1): 1992
All-Ireland Junior Football Championship (1): 1993
Munster Junior Football Championship (1): 1993
All-Ireland Minor Hurling Championship (1): 1985
Munster Minor Hurling Championship (1): 1985
Munster Minor Football Championship (1): 1985

Kildare
Leinster Senior Football Championship (2): 1998, 2000

References

1967 births
Living people
Bishopstown Gaelic footballers
Bishopstown hurlers
Clane Gaelic footballers
Cork inter-county Gaelic footballers
Cork inter-county hurlers
Dual players
Gaelic football managers
Kildare inter-county Gaelic footballers
UCC hurlers